Slovakia competed at the 2008 Summer Olympics in Beijing, People's Republic of China. The team includes 57 athletes in several sports.

Medalists

Athletics

Men
Track & road events

Field events

Combined events – Decathlon

Women
Track & road events

Field events

Badminton

Canoeing

Slalom

Sprint
Men

Women

Qualification Legend: QS = Qualify to semi-final; QF = Qualify directly to final

Cycling

Road

Mountain biking

Gymnastics

Artistic
Women

Judo

Sailing

Men

M = Medal race; EL = Eliminated – did not advance into the medal race; CAN = Race cancelled

Shooting

Men

* Kim Jong Su of North Korea originally won the silver medal in the 50 m pistol event, but was disqualified after he tested positive for propranolol. Therefore, Pavol Kopp moved up a position.

Women

Swimming

Men

Women

Table tennis

Tennis

Triathlon

Weightlifting

Wrestling

Men's freestyle

Men's Greco-Roman

See also
 Slovakia at the 2008 Summer Paralympics

References

External links
Slovakia NOC

Nations at the 2008 Summer Olympics
2008
Summer Olympics